List of ambassadors of Myanmar may refer to:
List of ambassadors of Myanmar to Belgium
List of ambassadors of Myanmar to Canada
List of ambassadors of Myanmar to China
List of ambassadors of Myanmar to France
List of ambassadors of Myanmar to Germany
List of ambassadors of Myanmar to India
List of ambassadors of Myanmar to Malaysia
List of ambassadors of Myanmar to Russia
List of ambassadors of Myanmar to the United Kingdom
List of ambassadors of Myanmar to the United States

Lists of ambassadors by country of origin